= Bogonos Stream =

Bogonos
- Location within Russia

Location
- Country: Russia

Physical characteristics
- Mouth: Oskina River
  - coordinates: 57.478°N 84.143°E

Basin features
- Progression: Oskina River → Verkhnyaya Anma → Ob → Kara Sea
- River system: Ob

The Bogonos Stream (Russian: Богонос) is a small river (stream) in Tomsk Oblast, Russia. Its length is about 8 km. It flows into the Oskina River, a basin of the Ob River.

The right bank of the stream is included in the Verkhne-Sorovsky Zakaznik.

== Sources ==
- Лист карты O-45-85. Масштаб: 1 : 100 000.
- Топографическая карта масштаба 1:50000 // ГОСГИСЦЕНТР.
